The Town Hall of Augsburg (German: Augsburger Rathaus) is the administrative centre of Augsburg, Bavaria, Germany, and one of the most significant secular buildings of the Renaissance style north of the Alps. It was designed and built by Elias Holl, Stadtbaumeister (Master Builder of the town), in 1615–1624. Due to its historic and cultural importance, it is protected by the Hague Convention for the Protection of Cultural Property in the Event of Armed Conflict.

Summary
On 25 August 1615, the foundation stone of the building was laid by then Stadtbaumeister Elias Holl. The exterior of the building was completed in March 1620, and the interior in 1624. Technologically, the Augsburger Rathaus was a pioneering performance; upon its completion it was the first building in the world with more than six storeys. The rigid elegance of the large stonework was similar to Florence, the cultural and financial capital of Northern Italy, with which the city gladly compared itself. The self-image of the Free Imperial City of Augsburg is represented by two conspicuous ornaments on the large gable at the front of the building: the first is the Reichsadler, or Imperial Eagle of the Holy Roman Empire, representing the town's importance; the second is the large copper pine cone, or Zirbelnuss, which is the symbol of Augsburg.

The view of the Rathaus was almost completely blocked by the stock exchange building built in 1828, until British bombing on the night of 25 February 1944 destroyed the latter. The removal of the remains of the stock exchange in the 1960s finally made it possible to view the Rathaus properly from the town square.

History

The original Augsburger Rathaus was built in 1385, and it was decided at the beginning of the seventeenth century to complete a simple renovation of it in order to accommodate the Imperial Reichstag, which then sat in the city. In 1609, the town council commissioned the renowned architect, Elias Holl, to draw up a renovation plan for the Gothic building. It was only after six years of work that Holl could produce a plan for the magistrates, but it was rejected by the council, and, to Holl's surprise, he was issued with a new brief, on the initiative of mayor Hieronymus Imhoff (1575–1638): to demolish the old Gothic town hall and erect in its place a beautiful new building.

Elias Holl produced his plan for the new Augsburger Rathaus, which was to be built in the Renaissance style, and, on 25 August 1615, the foundation stone was laid. It was the will of the magistrates that the Rathaus should not have a tower, however Elias Holl insisted on the famous onion domes by the gable, and in 1618 was allowed to proceed. The exterior of the Rathaus was completed in 1620, and the interior in 1624, following an almost fifteen-year planning phase and nine years of building.

Inside the Rathaus, Holl built three overlaying halls: on the ground floor, behind the main entrance, is the Lower Fletz, and on the floor above, the Upper Fletz; by far the most impressive room in the building, however, is the double-height Goldener Saal, or Golden Hall, with its magnificent doorways, murals and coffered ceiling. Adjacent to the Goldener Saal are the Fürstenzimmer, or Prince's Rooms, designed as retreats for important guests. The construction cost of the new Rathaus was around 100,000 Guilder.

The Thirty Years' War (1618–1648), which spread across Europe shortly after the beginning of work on the Rathaus, also took its toll on Augsburg. One of the major economic centres of the continent before the war, it emerged in the middle of the seventeenth century in decline. The war had cost Augsburg not only its centuries-old economic supremacy in Europe, but also more than half of its population. The Reichstag, for which the splendid Rathaus was originally built, now took place in other German cities. Only once more, in the late 17th Century, was the Rathaus the scene of a celebration of nationwide importance, when Joseph I held a banquet in the Golden Hall in 1690, on his coronation as King of the Romans.

During the devastating British bombing of Augsburg in World War II, the Rathaus was hit a number of times by high-explosive and incendiary bombs, completely burning the exterior of the building. The Rathaus was rebuilt after the war, the exterior according to its historic appearance but the interior much simplified, and from 1955 was again used as the administrative centre of the city. Between 1980 and 1984, the façade of the building was restored to its original colours, according to historical records. Inside the Renaissance building, what had been damaged in the Golden Hall during the war was restored to its original splendour, and on 9 January 1985, the Rathaus was reopened as part of the city's two-thousandth anniversary celebrations.

Rooms

Lower Fletz
The visitor enters the Augsburger Rathaus through an inconspicuous door at the front of the 
building, through a vestibule and into the Lower Fletz, on the ground floor. This monumental hall, with its marble columns and vaulted ceiling, is the main entrance to one of two staircases leading to the upper floors of the Rathaus.

Upper Fletz
The Upper Fletz, on the second floor, once housed the offices of the Augsburg town council, but since the war has been used as the meeting room of the council. The second floor also has offices of the political groups represented on the council. This part of the Rathaus is not generally open to visitors.

Golden Hall

The Goldener Saal, or Golden Hall, is the most impressive of the Rathaus's rooms, and one of the most important cultural monuments of the late German Renaissance. The interior of the Hall was designed by Johann Matthias Kager, and was not completed until 1643 (the rest of the building was completed in 1624). The numerous ceiling paintings and murals were executed according to a concept of the Jesuit  Matthäus Raders (1561 - 1634) and designs by the Flemish artist Peter Candid (1584-1628).

The Hall was badly damaged by bombing during the war. When the Rathaus was restored after the war, the Goldener Saal was not repaired to its original state, but left with a wooden ceiling, small doors and white plastered walls. It was used until the 1980s as an exhibition space. In the early 1980s, the council decided to renovate the Goldener Saal for the upcoming 2000th anniversary of the city in 1985. The room was redecorated according to historical drawings and photographs, starting with the basic reconstruction of the coffered ceiling, together with the painted ceilings, the floor and the doors. On 9 January 1985, the Hall was re-opened close to its former glory. Supported by numerous donations and the active interest of Augsburg, the murals and extensive gold jewellery that had once decorated the Hall were reinstated over subsequent years, and the hall was reopened a second time in 1996.
The master carpenter Wolfgang Ebner, who created this wonderful ceiling

Fürstenzimmer
The Fürstenzimmer, or Prince's Rooms, are four in number and located around the edges of the Golden Hall. They were originally used as retreats for distinguished guests of the council. These rooms were also badly damaged during the war, and only one has yet been fully restored. Work is continuing on the others.

Today
The Augsburger Rathaus now houses permanent exhibits on the history of the former imperial city and its partner cities, as well as frequently changing exhibitions on different historical and current political issues.. These are held in the Lower Fletz and are open to any visitor. The Goldener Saal is a popular venue for receptions, concerts and ceremonies. The Lower Fletz and Goldener Saal are open daily, although there is an entrance charge to the Goldener Saal. The basement of the Rathaus houses a Rathskeller.

See also
 History of early modern period domes

References

External links

Buildings and structures in Augsburg
City and town halls in Germany
Renaissance architecture in Germany
Buildings and structures completed in 1624
Registered historic buildings and monuments in Bavaria
1624 establishments in the Holy Roman Empire